Michael John "Mike" Artis, FBA (29 June 1938 – 8 January 2016) was a British economist. A leading macroeconomist, his research encompassed monetary economics, fiscal policies, and European institutions and policies.

Educated at Baines Grammar School and Magdalen College, Oxford, Artis joined the Oxford Institute of Statistics in 1959 and the National Institute for Economic and Social Research in 1967. He joined the Victoria University of Manchester in 1975. In 1994 he joined the European University Institute.

References 

 https://www.thebritishacademy.ac.uk/documents/1010/19_Artis_1837_9_11_17.pdf
 https://www.oxforddnb.com/view/10.1093/ref:odnb/9780198614128.001.0001/odnb-9780198614128-e-112082

1938 births
2016 deaths
Fellows of the British Academy
British economists
Alumni of Magdalen College, Oxford
Macroeconomists
Monetary economists
Academics of the Victoria University of Manchester
Academic staff of the European University Institute